An antipope is a person who makes a significant and substantial attempt to occupy the position of Bishop of Rome and leader of the Catholic Church in opposition to the legitimately elected pope. At times between the 3rd and mid-15th centuries, antipopes were supported by important factions within the Church itself and by secular rulers.

Sometimes it was difficult to distinguish which of two claimants should be called pope and which antipope, as in the case of Pope Leo VIII and Pope Benedict V.

Persons who merely claim to be pope and have few followers, such as the modern conclavist antipopes, are not classified with the historical antipopes.

History
Hippolytus of Rome (d. 235) is commonly considered to be the earliest antipope, as he headed a separate group within the Church in Rome against Pope Callixtus I. Hippolytus was reconciled to Callixtus's second successor, Pope Pontian, and both he and Pontian are honoured as saints by the Catholic Church with a shared feast day on 13 August. Whether two or more persons have been confused in this account of Hippolytus and whether Hippolytus actually declared himself to be the Bishop of Rome, remains unclear, since no such claim by Hippolytus has been cited in the writings attributed to him.

Eusebius quotes from an unnamed earlier writer the story of Natalius, a 3rd-century priest who accepted the bishopric of the Adoptionists, a heretical group in Rome. Natalius soon repented and tearfully begged Pope Zephyrinus to receive him into communion.

Novatian (d. 258), another third-century figure, certainly claimed the See of Rome in opposition to Pope Cornelius, and if Natalius and Hippolytus were excluded because of the uncertainties concerning them, Novatian could then be said to be the first antipope.

The period in which antipopes were most numerous was during the struggles between the popes and the Holy Roman Emperors of the 11th and 12th centuries. The emperors frequently imposed their own nominees to further their own causes. The popes, likewise, sometimes sponsored rival imperial claimants (anti-kings) in Germany to overcome a particular emperor.

The Western Schism—which began in 1378, when the French cardinals, claiming that the election of Pope Urban VI was invalid, elected antipope Clement VII as a rival to the Roman Pope—led eventually to two competing lines of antipopes: the Avignon line as Clement VII moved back to Avignon, and the Pisan line. The Pisan line, which began in 1409, was named after the town of Pisa, Italy, where the (Pisan) council had elected antipope Alexander V as a third claimant. To end the schism, in May 1415, the Council of Constance deposed antipope John XXIII of the Pisan line. Pope Gregory XII of the Roman line resigned in July 1415. In 1417, the council also formally deposed antipope Benedict XIII of Avignon, but he adamantly refused to resign. Afterwards, Pope Martin V was elected and was accepted everywhere except in the small and rapidly diminishing area of influence of Benedict XIII.

List of historical antipopes 

The following table gives the names of the antipopes included in the list of popes and antipopes in the Annuario Pontificio, with the addition of the names of Natalius (in spite of doubts about his historicity) and Antipope Clement VIII (whose following was insignificant).
 
An asterisk marks those who were included in the conventional numbering of later popes who took the same name. More commonly, the antipope is ignored in later papal regnal numbers; for example, there was an Antipope John XXIII, but the new Pope John elected in 1958 was also called John XXIII. For the additional confusion regarding popes named John, see Pope John numbering.

The list of popes and antipopes in the Annuario Pontificio attaches the following note to the name of Pope Leo VIII (963–965):

At this point, as again in the mid-11th century, we come across elections in which problems of harmonising historical criteria and those of theology and canon law make it impossible to decide clearly which side possessed the legitimacy whose factual existence guarantees the unbroken lawful succession of the successors of Saint Peter. The uncertainty that in some cases results has made it advisable to abandon the assignation of successive numbers in the list of the popes.

Thus, because of the obscurities about mid-11th-century canon law and the historical facts, the Annuario Pontificio lists Sylvester III as a pope, without thereby expressing a judgement on his legitimacy. The Catholic Encyclopedia places him in its List of Popes, but with the annotation: "Considered by some to be an antipope". Other sources classify him as an antipope.

As Celestine II resigned before being consecrated and enthroned in order to avoid a schism, Oxford's A Dictionary of Popes (2010) says he "...is classified, unfairly, as an antipope," a position historian Salvador Miranda also shares.

Those with asterisks (*) were counted in subsequent papal numbering.

Quasi-cardinal-nephews 

Many antipopes created cardinals, known as quasi-cardinals, and a few created cardinal-nephews, known as quasi-cardinal-nephews.

Antipope of Alexandria 
As the Patriarch of Alexandria, Egypt, has historically also held the title of pope, a person who, in opposition to someone who is generally accepted as a legitimate pope of Alexandria, claims to hold that position may also be considered an antipope. In 2006, the defrocked married Coptic lector Max Michel became an antipope of Alexandria, calling himself Maximos I. His claim to the Alexandrine papacy was dismissed by both the Coptic Orthodox Pope Shenouda III and Pope Theodore II of the Greek Orthodox Church of Alexandria. The Coptic pope of Alexandria and the Greek pope of Alexandria currently view one another, not as antipopes, but rather as successors to differing lines of apostolic succession that formed as a result of christological disputes in the fifth century.

Another Coptic (Alexandrian) antipope is known to have laid claim in the fourth century. His name was Gregory of Cappadocia.

In fiction 
Antipopes have appeared as fictional characters. These may be either in historical fiction, as fictional portraits of well-known historical antipopes or as purely imaginary antipopes.
 Jean Raspail's novel l'Anneau du pêcheur (The Fisherman's Ring), and Gérard Bavoux's Le Porteur de lumière (The Light-bringer).
 The fictional synth-pop artist Zladko Vladcik claims to be "The Anti-Pope" in one of his songs.
 Dan Simmons's novels Endymion and The Rise of Endymion feature a Father Paul Duré who is the routinely murdered antipope Teilhard I. At the end of the last novel, it is mentioned that the person calling himself the pope of the Technocore loyal Catholics is recognized by very few even among those, and he is referred to as an antipope.
 In the Girl Genius comics series, set in a gaslamp fantasy version of Europe thrown into chaos by mad science (among other things), there is a brief reference to the existence of seven popes—all of whom apparently ordered a particular text burned.
 Ralph McInerny's novel The Red Hat features a schism between liberals and conservatives following the election of a conservative African Pope; the liberal faction elect an Italian cardinal who calls himself "Pius XIII".
 In the video game Crusader Kings II by Swedish developer Paradox Interactive, Catholic rulers may appoint one of their bishops as an antipope. An emperor-tier ruler such as the Holy Roman Emperor may declare war on the Papal States to install their antipope as the "true" pope, thereby vassalizing the Papacy.
 In the video game Age of Empires II the third scenario in the game's Barbarossa campaign is called "Pope and Antipope" and is based on the Siege of Crema and the subsequent Wars of the Guelphs and Ghibellines. 
 In episode 3 of The Black Adder (set in the late 15th century), "The Archbishop", Baldrick remarks on selling counterfeit papal pardons, that one for the highest crimes requires the signatures of "both popes" (implying one pope and one antipope). At the end of the episode, the Mother Superior of the local convent informs Edmund that he has been excommunicated by "all three popes".
The Last Fisherman by Randy England features an anti-pope John XXIV elected in opposition to Pope Brendan I
Bud McFarlane's Pierced by a Sword includes an anti-pope John XXIV who is elected when the assassination attempt on Pope Patrick (fictional successor to John Paul II) is believed to have succeeded. He commits suicide at the end of the book.
Chilling Adventures of Sabrina features an antipope who leads the Churches of Darkness.  This antipope reigns in the Vatican Necropolis beneath Rome.

See also
 List of papal elections
 Papal conclave
 Papal selection before 1059
 Sedevacantism
 Pretender

References

External links and bibliography 

 Catholic Encyclopedia: "Antipope"
 Encyclopædia Britannica: "Antipope"
 The Pope Encyclopaedia: "Antipope"
 Kelly, J.N.D, The Oxford Dictionary of Popes, Oxford University Press, US (1986), .
 Raspail, Jean, 'L'Anneau du pêcheur, Paris: Albin Michel, 1994. 403 pp. .
 Bavoux, Gérard, Le Porteur de lumière, Paris: Pygmalion, 1996. 329 pp. .

 
Ecclesiastical titles
History of the papacy
Lists of Catholic popes